Imraan Khan (born 27 April 1984) is a former South African cricketer who played domestic cricket and captained the Dolphins. He also captained his country at under 19 level. He is currently the head coach of the Hollywoodbets Dolphins.

Khan made his international debut in the third Test of the home series against Australia in 2008/09. Khan opened the batting and went on to score 20 runs in South Africa's first innings. South Africa won the Test by an innings and secured a consolation win, after having lost the previous two Tests, and the three Test-match series. He was included in the KZN Inland squad for the 2015 Africa T20 Cup.

References

External links
 

1984 births
Living people
KwaZulu-Natal cricketers
KwaZulu-Natal Inland cricketers
Dolphins cricketers
South African cricketers
South Africa Test cricketers
South African people of Indian descent